The 2010–11 synchronized skating season began on July 1, 2010, and ended on June 30, 2011. During this season, which was concurrent with the season for the other four disciplines (men's single, ladies' single, pair skating and ice dancing), elite synchronized skating teams competed on the International Skating Union (ISU) Championship level at the 2011 Senior World Championships and Junior World Challenge Cup. They also competed at various other international as well as national synchronized skating competitions.

Competitions
The 2010–11 season included the following major competitions:

Key

International medalists

Season's best scores

Senior teams

References 

2010 in figure skating
2011 in figure skating
Seasons in synchronized skating